James Campbell Ker    (1878–1961) was Unionist Party (Scotland) MP for Stirling and Clackmannan Western.

He was elected in 1931, but stood down in 1935.

Before his election, Ker was a member of the Indian Civil Service and personal assistant to the Director of Criminal Intelligence from 1907 to 1913.

References

External links
 Political Trouble in India 1907-1917 by James Campbell Ker at the South Asian American Digital Archive (SAADA)

1878 births
1961 deaths
Members of the Parliament of the United Kingdom for Stirling constituencies
UK MPs 1931–1935
Unionist Party (Scotland) MPs
Indian Civil Service (British India) officers
Companions of the Order of the Star of India
Companions of the Order of the Indian Empire